The Acheron was a small river of Triphylia in ancient Elis, flowing northward from the Minthe Mountains and joining the Alpheius River as a tributary.

References

Geography of ancient Elis
Rivers of Greece
Triphylia